NATCO Group was a medium-sized company based in Houston, Texas, officially founded in 1988 but essentially the successor of the National Tank Company which was founded in 1926; it manufactured equipment for separating oil, natural gas and water from one another, which is used in most oil-producing regions of the world. Its turnover in 2008 was $650 million and it had 2400 employees.

In November 2009 it was acquired by Cameron International in a $780 million all-stock transaction, the intent being to insource processing and separation products for Cameron.

In January 2010 NATCO settled an FCPA case, admitting that it had paid bribes to Kazakhstan officials who would otherwise have questioned the immigration status of its workers there and invoiced for them as miscellaneous expenses.

Whilst most of its revenue came from the US, it had projects in Kazakhstan, south-east Asia and the Canadian oil sands

References 

Companies formerly listed on the New York Stock Exchange
Energy companies of the United States
Oilfield services companies
Manufacturing companies based in Houston